José Manuel Rey Cortegoso (born 20 May 1975) is a Venezuelan former footballer who played as a central defender, currently a manager.

Known as Pokémon and Tetero, and a free kick specialist, he represented mainly Caracas in a 20-year professional career.

Rey was at one time Venezuela's second-most ever capped player, surpassing 100 international appearances. He was part of the squads at six Copa América tournaments.

Club career
During his career, Rey played mainly with Caracas FC, also representing several clubs in Europe and South America: C.S. Marítimo de Venezuela, C.S. Emelec (two spells), Pontevedra CF, Atlético Nacional and AEK Larnaca FC. In 1995, he had a short spell with Deportivo de La Coruña in Spain, but only appeared for the reserves. In 2000 he signed a pre-contract with Dundee FC, but ultimately failed to join to the Scottish side.

In late September 2009, Rey was sent on loan to Colo-Colo in Chile, as a replacement for injured Luis Mena. After an irregular start he established himself in the starting XI, helping them win the Primera División championship.

The loan was to be extended if Colo-Colo qualified to the Copa Libertadores, which eventually happened, but Rey returned to Caracas. In January 2011, after five spells with his main club, the 35-year-old signed for A.C.C.D. Mineros de Guayana.

Rey changed teams again in June 2011, moving to Asociación Civil Deportivo Lara. He retired four years later aged 40, and subsequently worked as manager of Aragua F.C. and Monagas S.C. but also sporting director of Deportivo Lara.

International career
Rey played 115 international matches for the Venezuela national team. His debut came on 8 June 1997, in a 1998 FIFA World Cup qualifier against Bolivia in Valera (1–1 draw).

On 13 October 2007, Rey scored from a spectacular free kick in a 1–0 win over Ecuador in the 2010 World Cup qualifying stages. This signalled Ecuador's first defeat in Quito in six years.

On 6 September 2008, in a 1–0 loss to Peru at the Estadio Monumental in Lima, in another qualifier, Rey became the first player to appear 100 times for Venezuela. He also represented the nation in six Copa América tournaments.

During one year, Rey acted as second in command to Noel Sanvicente at the national side's coaching staff.

International goals

|-
| 1. || 27 January 1999 || José Pachencho Romero, Maracaibo, Venezuela ||  || 1–0 || 1–1 || Friendly
|-
| 2. || 15 June 1999 || Pueblo Nuevo, San Cristóbal, Venezuela ||  || 2–2 || 3–2 || Friendly
|-
| 3. || 20 June 1999 || Misael Delgado, Valencia, Venezuela ||  || 1–0 || 3–0 || Friendly
|-
| 4. || 20 October 2002 || Brígido Iriarte, Caracas, Venezuela ||  || 1–0 || 2–0 || Friendly
|-
| 5. || 18 November 2003 || José Pachencho Romero, Maracaibo, Venezuela ||  || 1–1 || 2–1 || 2006 World Cup qualification
|-
| 6. || 18 November 2003 || José Pachencho Romero, Maracaibo, Venezuela ||  || 2–1 || 2–1 || 2006 World Cup qualification
|-
| 7. || 15 November 2006 || Brígido Iriarte, Caracas, Venezuela ||  || 2–0 || 2–1 || Friendly
|-
| 8. || 13 October 2007 || Olímpico Atahualpa, Quito, Ecuador ||  || 0–1 || 0–1 || 2010 World Cup qualification
|-
| 9. || 10 June 2009 || Polideportivo Cachamay, Puerto Ordaz, Venezuela ||  || 0–1 || 2–2 || 2010 World Cup qualification
|-
| 10. || 12 August 2009 || Giants Stadium, New York City, United States ||  || 0–1 || 1–2 || Friendly
|-
| 11. || 5 September 2009 || Monumental David Arellano, Santiago, Chile ||  || 1–2 || 2–2 || 2010 World Cup qualification
|}

Honours
Caracas
Venezuelan Primera División: 1996–97, 2003–04, 2006–07, 2008–09, 2009–10; Clausura 2004, 2007 and 2009, Apertura 2003

Colo-Colo
Chilean Primera División: Clausura 2009

Deportivo Lara
Venezuelan Primera División: 2011–12

Individual
Caracas FC Footballer of the Year: 2008–09

See also
List of men's footballers with 100 or more international caps

References

External links

Football-Lineups profile

1975 births
Living people
Venezuelan footballers
Footballers from Caracas
Association football defenders
Venezuelan Primera División players
Caracas FC players
A.C.C.D. Mineros de Guayana players
Asociación Civil Deportivo Lara players
Segunda División players
Deportivo Fabril players
Pontevedra CF footballers
Ecuadorian Serie A players
C.S. Emelec footballers
Categoría Primera A players
Atlético Nacional footballers
Cypriot First Division players
AEK Larnaca FC players
Chilean Primera División players
Colo-Colo footballers
Venezuela international footballers
1997 Copa América players
1999 Copa América players
2001 Copa América players
2004 Copa América players
2007 Copa América players
2011 Copa América players
FIFA Century Club
Venezuelan expatriate footballers
Expatriate footballers in Spain
Expatriate footballers in Ecuador
Expatriate footballers in Colombia
Expatriate footballers in Cyprus
Expatriate footballers in Chile
Venezuelan expatriate sportspeople in Spain
Venezuelan expatriate sportspeople in Ecuador
Venezuelan expatriate sportspeople in Colombia
Venezuelan expatriate sportspeople in Cyprus
Venezuelan expatriate sportspeople in Chile
Venezuelan football managers
Aragua F.C. managers
Monagas S.C. managers
Zamora F.C. managers